Women Against War is the name of two organizations of women opposed to war. The first of these organizations was created in the 1950s in response to the Vietnam War. The second is the currently operating organization working out of Delmar, New York.

Past
The Vietnam War played a major role in the creation of many anti-war organizations. This war had heavy disdain from the general population

Mary Phelps Jacob, later known as Caresse Crosby, founded the organization during the 1950s. Part of her work for the Women Against War group was her attempt to establish a Peace Act of 1950. In an attempt to support the bill, she proposed "Peace Bonds" that would be similar to the savings bonds the government put out. Jacob also lobbied for a Department of Peace. Her work was not embraced by those she attempted to appeal to. She also worked to create a group known as the "Citizens of the World."

During the time of the Women Against War, there was another women's anti-war activist group known as Women Strike for Peace, which worked for and succeeded in obtaining a nuclear test ban, and a student-led group called the Student Peace Union.

Present
The modern Women Against War group was created by women in the Capital Region and surrounding communities. The vision statement of the organization is that "War is Not the Answer" and that women can help to develop alternatives to violence.
Activities that the Women Against War group has taken part in include:
 Fast for Peace
 Voices and Bells
 The Peace Tent

Current projects:
 Pathways to Peace is an arm of WAW that undertakes specific efforts, which focus on a new theme each year.  The upcoming year (2020) will center on climate change, particularly its effects on immigration, as a contributor to war, and with reference to the coronavirus pandemic. Events such as vigils, presentations by speakers, leafletting, meetings with legislators, letter-writing campaigns, etc., are all part of its outreach to the community and beyond.
 Iraqi Refugee Project
 Grannies for Peace

The Women Against War organization also supports a Facebook page.

Future
The Women Against War group works continuously to lay the foundation for a peaceful world. They seem to be using the political process theory described by sociologists as being focused on openings in the formal political system.

See also
 War resister

References

External links
 WAW, Delmar, New York

Anti-war movement
Anti–Iraq War groups
Women's organizations based in the United States